Tiger Field  is a public use airport owned by the U.S. Bureau of Land Management and located three nautical miles (6 km) south of the central business district of Fernley, a city in Lyon County, Nevada, United States.

History 
The airport hosted the Fernley Fly-In 2001.

Facilities and aircraft 
It has two runways: 15/33 is 3,974 by 40 feet (1,211 x 12 m) with an asphalt surface; 5/23 is 2,750 by 40 feet (838 x 12 m) with a gravel surface.

For the 12-month period ending June 30, 2009, the airport had 2,400 general aviation aircraft operations, an average of 200 per month. At that time there were 6 aircraft based at this airport: 100% single-engine.

References

External links 
  from Nevada DOT
 Aerial image as of June 1994 from USGS The National Map
 

Airports in Nevada
Buildings and structures in Lyon County, Nevada
Transportation in Lyon County, Nevada